Ephs or EPHS may refer to:
 Williams Ephs, the varsity intercollegiate athletic programs of Williams College
 Ephrin receptor, a protein

Schools 
 United Kingdom
 Elthorne Park High School, Hanwell, London, England
 United States
 Eagle Point High School, Eagle Point, Oregon
 East Paulding High School, Dallas, Georgia
 East Providence High School, East Providence, Rhode Island
 Eden Prairie High School, Eden Prairie, Minnesota
 Elmwood Park High School, Elmwood Park, Illinois
 El Paso High School, El Paso, Texas

See also 
 EPH (disambiguation)